Renate Gietl (born 10 January 1982) is an Italian luger who has competed since 1997. A natural track luger, she won nine medals at the FIL World Luge Natural Track Championships with a four medals in women's singles (Gold: 2009, 2011); Silver: 2001, Bronze: 2005) and five medals in the mixed team event (Gold: 2009, 2011; Silver: 2007, Bronze: 2003, 2005).

Gietl also earned four medals at the FIL European Luge Natural Track Championships with a silver (mixed team: 2010) and three bronzes (women's singles: 2006, 2008, 2010).

References
FIL-Luge profile
Natural track European Championships results 1970-2006.
Natural track World Championships results: 1979-2007

External links

 

1982 births
Living people
Italian lugers
Italian female lugers
People from Feldthurns
Sportspeople from Südtirol